Datasoft, Inc. (also written as DataSoft and Data Soft) was a software developer and publisher for home computers founded in 1980 by Pat Ketchum and based out of Chatsworth, California. Datasoft primarily published video games, including home ports of arcade games, games based on licenses from movies and TV shows, and original games. Like competitor Synapse Software, the company also published other software: development tools, word processors, and utilities. Text Wizard, written by William Robinson and published by Datasoft when he was 16, was the basis for AtariWriter. Datasoft initially targeted the Atari 8-bit family, Apple II, and TRS-80 Color Computer, then later the Commodore 64, IBM PC, Atari ST, and Amiga. Starting in 1983, a line of lower cost software was published under the name Gentry Software.

Datasoft went into bankruptcy, and its name and assets were purchased by two Datasoft executives, Samuel L. Poole and Ted Hoffman.  They renamed the company IntelliCreations and distributed Datasoft games until it closed.

Software

Games

1982
Canyon Climber
Clowns and Balloons
Dung Beetles
Pacific Coast Highway
Shooting Arcade
The Sands of Egypt
1983
Genesis
Juno First, arcade port
Moon Shuttle, arcade port
Nibbler, arcade port
O'Riley's Mine
Pooyan, arcade port
Zaxxon, arcade port
1984
Conan
Bruce Lee
Lost Tomb, arcade port
The Dallas Quest
Mancopter
Mr. Do!, arcade port
Pac-Man, arcade port
Pole Position, arcade port
1985
Alternate Reality: The City
The Goonies
Tomahawk
Zorro
1986
Crosscheck
Mercenary
Mind Pursuit
1987
221B Baker Street
Alternate Reality: The Dungeon
Bismarck
Black Magic
Dark Lord
Force 7
Gunslinger
Saracen
1988
Napoleon in Russia: Borodino 1812 (MS-DOS)

Games under the Gentry Software label
Leap'in Lizards! (1983)
Magneto Bugs (1983)
Maniac Miner (1983)
 Maxwell's Demon / Memory Mania (1983)
Rosen's Brigade (1983)
Sea Bandit (1983)
Spiderquake (1983)
Starbase Fighter (1983)
Target Practice (1983)

Education
Bishop's Square / Maxwell's Demon (1982)

Word processing
Text Wizard (1981)
Spell Wizard (1982)
Letter Wizard (1984)

Other software
Micro-Painter (1982)

References

External links
 
 Adventureland Company Profile

Atari 8-bit family
Video game companies established in 1980
Defunct video game companies of the United States
Defunct companies based in Greater Los Angeles